Omega Training Group, Inc. was a company that provided analysis, training development, Interactive Multimedia Instruction (IMI), and integrated logistics support for defense-oriented programs. Omega provided products and services to United States Department of Defense agencies, the defense industry, and commercial clients.

Headquartered in Columbus, Georgia, United States, just north of the U.S. Army Infantry Center and School at Fort Benning, Omega employed approximately 750 employees in locations all over the United States.

On July 29, 2008 Cubic Corporation finalized the acquisition of Omega Training Group.

References

News stories
 
 
 
  

Education companies established in 1990
Companies disestablished in 2008
Companies based in Columbus, Georgia
Defense companies of the United States
Training companies of the United States
1990 establishments in Georgia (U.S. state)
2008 disestablishments in Georgia (U.S. state)
2008 mergers and acquisitions